The 1973 Nepal plane hijack (also known as the Biratnagar Plane Hijack) was the first plane hijacking in the history of Nepal. Girija Prasad Koirala planned the hijack to steal money that the Nepal Rastra Bank was having transported from Biratnagar to Kathmandu.

The main motive for this incident was to gather funds for an armed revolution to restore multi-party democracy by overthrowing the party-less Panchayat system headed by the King in Nepal, Mahendra of Nepal.

Aircraft
The aircraft was a DHC-6 Twin Otter (Registration: 9N-ABB) and was delivered to Royal Nepal Airlines in 1971.

Hijackers
Girija Prasad Koirala was the main architect of this hijack. He wanted an armed fight for democracy in Nepal, but did not have sufficient funds. He coordinated with another democratic fighter Durga Subedi. Subedi was recently released from prison, where he read about the hijacking of Japan Airlines Flight 351. He came up with the idea of a plane hijack to collect the funds by carrying out a similar hijack. They were tipped from Madan Aryal who worked at Nepal Rastra Bank in Biratnagar and knew that the bank would transport Indian currency by plane through Biratnagar. Nagendra Dhungel and Basanta Bhattarai joined the team to hijack the plane.

Crew and passengers
Three crew members and 19 passengers were on board the flight, including actress Mala Sinha.

Hijacking
On 10 June 1973, Nepal Rastra Bank planned to transport Indian Rupees from Arrariya, India to Kathmandu via Biratnagar. It was transported to Biratnagar by land, and was supposed then go to Kathmandu by air. At 8:30 NPT, the 19-seater Royal Nepal Airlines Twin Otter passenger aircraft took off for Kathmandu from Biratnagar. The three hijackers hijacked the plane within five minutes of take-off. They forced the pilot to land the plane in Forbesganj, Bihar, in a grass field and took 3 million Indian rupees that belonged to the Nepalese government. 

The hijackers who boarded the plane were Basanta Bhattarai, Durga Subedi, and Nagendra Prasad Dhungel. Girija Prasad Koirala and Chakra Prasad Bastola were involved in transportation of the loot to Darjeeling. They hid it in the house of B. L. Sharma, an acquaintance of Bishweshwar Prasad Koirala. Ganesh Sharma, an Indian national, arrived with a jeep to the landing site. Other members involved who were at the field in Forbesganj were Binod Aryal, Sushil Koirala , Manahari Baral, Rajendra Dahal and Biru Lama. Three different vehicles were used in transporting the three boxes of cash to Darjeeling.

Weapons used
The pistols used were illegal and had no license. Two 32 revolvers and one 36 grenade bomb were used..

Aftermath
The plane took off immediately with the passengers after the boxes of cash were taken out. The hijackers went first to Darjeeling, then to Banaras and finally to Mumbai. The hijackers occasionally made trips to New Delhi to meet BP Koirala, the then President of Nepali Congress. However, within a year all hijackers were arrested in India except Nagendra Dhungel. After the 1975 Emergency in India ended, they were released on bail.

The DH-6 was used afterward for Nepalese flights for another 41 years, until it was destroyed in the 2014 crash of Nepal Airlines Flight 183 . The parts of the aircraft were brought to Nepalganj and were put together again and are currently being exhibited in the BP Museum in Sundarijal, Kathmandu.

In 2017, a political and historical documentary about this incident titled Hijacking for Democracy was screened at the Nepal Tourism Board in Bhrikutimandap, Kathmandu.

Controversies
It has been alleged that the money, meant to be used in the struggle for democracy, was misused. BP Koirala himself suspected that the money was misused.

See also
 Indian Airlines Flight 814

References

Further reading
  Subedi, Durga  (2018). विमान विद्रोह - एउटा राजनीतिक अपहरणको बयान (in Nepali). Kitab Publishers Pvt. Ltd., Kathmandu.

External links
"The skyjack that shook Panchayat"

1973 in aviation
Aircraft hijackings
1973 in Nepal
Aviation accidents and incidents in 1973
Aviation accidents and incidents in Nepal
Accidents and incidents involving the de Havilland Canada DHC-6 Twin Otter
Nepal Airlines accidents and incidents
1973 crimes in Nepal
1973 disasters in Nepal